Wigtown ( (both used locally)) is a town and former royal burgh in Wigtownshire, of which it is the county town, within the Dumfries and Galloway region in Scotland.  It lies east of Stranraer and south of Newton Stewart. It is known as "Scotland's National Book Town" with a high concentration of second-hand book shops and an annual book festival.

Wigtown is part of the Machars peninsula.

History

Name origins
W.F.H. Nicolaisen offered two explanations for the place-name Wigtown. One theory was that it meant 'dwelling place', from the Old English 'wic-ton'; however, if it is the same as Wigton in Cumbria, which was 'Wiggeton' in 1162 and 'Wigeton' in 1262, it may be 'Wigca's farm'. Other sources have suggested a Norse root with 'Vik' meaning 'bay', giving the origin as a translation of 'The town on the bay'.

Neolithic Age

The surrounding area (the Machars peninsula) is rich in prehistoric remains, most notably the Torhousekie Standing Stones, a Neolithic stone circle set on a raised platform of smaller stones.  It consists of nineteen boulders up to 5 feet high aligned to the winter solstice, surrounding a ring cairn on which there are 3 large stones (flankers), two upright and one recumbent.  On a low ridge across the road from the circle there are another three stones.

Early history

Andrew Symson, a 17th-century minister, suggested the first settlement would have stood on low-lying sands between the present-day Wigtown and Creetown. Wigtown had two ports (gates) which may have been closed at night to form a large cattle enclosure. These were East Port, opposite a site later occupied by the British Linen Bank, and the West Port, which stood opposite the mouth of the High Vennel.

Blackfriars, the Dominican friary, was founded at "Friarland" north of the mouth of the Bladnoch, south-east of the town of Wigtown, by Devorgilla in around 1267.

Wigtown Castle was in existence by 1291, on flat land down by the River Bladnoch, (outlines clearly seen on an aerial view), whilst the town and church were on a hill, "an inversion of the usual arrangements". Nothing remains of the castle, although a strong natural site and indication of a large enclosed and defended area seems to point to a castle of the Edwardian type (Edward I) dating from the end of the 13th century. The site of the castle was excavated after a fashion about 1830, by a Captain Robert M’Kerlie and a team of volunteers. The outlines of a building were clearly traced on that occasion and a ditch, which had been broad, was distinctly seen on the north where there was also a semi-circular ridge of considerable elevation said to be the remains of the castle's outer wall. A few years later, a reporter in the New Statistical Account wrote that a fosse was quite discernible, although "the foundations of the walls cannot now be traced". Mortar and "other remains indicative of an ancient building" were still to be observed.

The town developed as port and became a royal burgh in 1292.

The royal burgh was granted to Sir Malcolm Fleming by David II in 1341. In 1372 Wigtown was purchased by Archibald the Grim Lord of Galloway. When he later became Earl of Douglas in 1384, it became attached to that earldom. It was restored to its former tenure as a royal burgh as a result of the forfeiture of the Douglases in 1455. Its status was formally recognised be a royal charter in 1457.

Wigtown Martyrs

Monuments to the Wigtown Martyrs exist in Wigtown. During "The Killing Times" of the Covenanters in the 17th century, Margaret McLachlan, an elderly woman in her 60s, and Margaret Willson, a teenager, were sentenced to be tied to stakes in the tidal channel of the River Bladnoch near its entrance to Wigtown Bay to be drowned by the incoming tide. The execution date was 11 May 1685. The ploy was that the younger woman might be persuaded to change her mind after watching the older woman drown. The strategy failed and both died. This execution was carried out by dragoons under the command of Major Windram in the presence of Sir Robert Grierson of Lag who held the King's Commission to suppress the rebels in the South West. Their story, as told in various sources, tells how the women were betrayed by an informer. After about a month in prison they were tried as rebels and sentenced to death by drowning. The story of the Wigtown Martyrs was among those collected by Robert Wodrow and published in his History of the Sufferings of the Church of Scotland from the Restoration to the Revolution.  The Church of Scotland synod had decided in 1708 to collect accounts of persecution under the Stuart monarchs, and persuaded Wodrow to take on the research. He wrote that Thomas Wilson "lives now in his father's room, and is ready to attest all I am writing."

Later history
An early reference to a tolbooth in Wigtown occurs in the late 16th century, and it is possible that this structure was blown up by gunpowder to make way for the new town hall which was completed in 1756. This municipal building in its turn gave way to the Wigtown County Buildings which were erected in 1862. Wigtown removed its first mercat cross in the late 17th century. A second market cross was erected in the main street in 1818.

Andrew Symson, a 17th-century minister of the church at Kirkinner, left a description of Wigtown. Writing in 1684, he described Wigtown as having "a market for horses and young phillies...which the borderers come and buy in great numbers."

Residents of Wigtown and the surrounding area earned their livings in a variety of ways.  An 18th-century observer, Samuel Robinson commented that from its peculiar position in relation to the sea, the county of Wigtown offered many singular advantages to the landing of smuggled goods and smugglers were not slow in taking advantage of this: however after a barracks was built "the trade and those who conducted it were ruined".

Robinson, describing Wigtown, also noted that "the greatest number of houses were of a homely character, thatched and one storey high".

The Newton Stewart to Whithorn branch railway line had a station at Wigtown which opened in 1877.

Recent history
Wigtown was described by William Learmonth in 1920 as the quaintest county town in Scotland.

RAF Wigtown was constructed on the outskirts of the town and opened in 1941. Under the control of 29 Group RAF, the Station was home to No. 1 Air Observers School, later No. 1 Advanced Flying Unit (Observer), as well as providing a short-term home to several operational RAF squadrons. The Station was closed in 1948. Today it is very occasionally used by light aircraft, sometimes being referred to as Baldoon Airfield.

In the 1990s Wigtown became Scotland's "book town". However, in contrast to Hay-on-Wye, Wigtown's status as a book town was planned, in order to regenerate a very depressed town (the main employers, the creamery and distillery, having closed in the 1990s), although the distillery (Bladnoch) has now re-opened and is distilling its own malt whisky. There was a national search in Scotland for a candidate town. The Wigtown Book Festival was first held in 1999 and grew to be the second largest book festival in Scotland.

Education
Wigtown Primary School is based in New Road in Wigtown.

Churches

Wigtown Parish Church was designed in the Gothic Revival style and completed in 1858.

Sacred Heart Catholic Church was designed in the Gothic Revival style and completed in 1879.

Wigtown Quaker Meeting House is as at Chapel Court, South Main Street.

Wigtown Baptist Church is in Southfield Lane.

Places of interest
The River Bladnoch can be fished for Atlantic salmon and has historically been well known as one of Scotland's finest rivers producing spring fish. It meets the River Cree in Wigtown Bay, meandering through a large area of salt marsh which has been designated as a Local Nature Reserve (LNR). Wigtown Bay is the largest LNR in Britain, and is home to a wealth of wildlife, particularly birds. Some people come to admire them from the comfort of the viewing hides situated near the harbour, others, wildfowlers, come to harvest some of the plentiful ducks and geese attracted by the extensive conservation work carried out by the Wigtown Wildfowling Club. The first pair of ospreys to return to Galloway in over 100 years arrived in 2004. A live camera link to their nest was created and can be viewed in the Wigtown County Buildings.

To the east of Wigtown is The Martyrs' Stake, a monument marking the traditional site where the Wigtown Martyrs were drowned in the 17th century. Their graves are in the Parish Church cemetery. There is a small cell in the County Buildings in which they were imprisoned prior to their execution. This cell is all that remains of a much older building which was largely destroyed to make way for the County Buildings (built in 1862).

In popular culture
Jessica A. Fox's Three Things You Need to Know About Rockets (2013) is her account of following her dream and moving from Los Angeles and a job at NASA to help run a bookshop in Wigtown and finding love.

Shaun Bythell's The Diary of a Bookseller, published 2017, and Confessions of a Bookseller (2019) detail his experiences as the owner of The Bookshop, Scotland's largest second-hand bookshop.

The BBC reported on 2 October 2018 that options on Fox's book and Bythell's first book had been bought by  "a Hollywood film company" with the idea of combining them to create a movie.

In the Harry Potter universe, the Wigtown Wanderers quidditch team come from the town.

Notable people

 John McConnell Black, botanist and linguist.
 Robert Cance, member of the Wisconsin State Assembly.
 Helen D'Oyly Carte, hotelier and theatre producer and manager.
 Although the actor James Robertson Justice was not (as he claimed) born at Wigtown, he did have ancestral links with the area.
 Dave Kevan, professional footballer for Notts County and Stoke City between 1985 and 1994; ex caretaker-manager at Notts County.
 Paul Laverty, Ken Loach's preferred screenwriter (I, Daniel Blake, The Wind that Shakes the Barley, Carla's Song, etc.), grew up in the town and was educated at All Souls' School in Wigtown.
 Adrian J McDowall, BAFTA award-winning film and television director grew up in Wigtown.
 John McFadyean, veterinary surgeon and professor of veterinary science was born in Wigtown.
 Louis McGuffie, Victoria Cross holder. He was aged 24 and the son of Mrs Catherine McGuffie of 1 North Main Street, Wigtown. He is buried at the Zantvoorde British Cemetery, Zonnebeke, Belgium.
 Ian Niall, author. His book The Wigtown Ploughman gave its name to one of the local pubs.
 Mary Broadfoot Walker, a physician noted for first demonstrating the effectiveness of physostigmine in treating myasthenia gravis.
 Margaret Wilson, 17th-century Covenanter martyr for the Free Church in Scotland.

See also
 Wigtown (Parliament of Scotland constituency)
 List of listed buildings in Wigtown, Dumfries and Galloway
 Hay on Wye, the Welsh national book town.
 Sedbergh, the English national book town.

Gallery (click on photos)

References

External links 

 Wigtown Booktown website
 Royal Burgh of Wigtown and District Community Council
 Video footage of Wigtown Harbour and the River Bladnoch
 Video and narration of Cruel Lagg and the Wigtown Martyrs
 Video and narration of The Wigtown Martyrs' Monument
https://canmore.org.uk/site/215449/wigtown-south-main-street-sacred-heart-roman-catholic-church

 
Towns in Dumfries and Galloway
Wigtownshire
Ports and harbours of Scotland
Literary festivals in Scotland
Parishes in Dumfries and Galloway
County towns in Scotland